The Kennebec Valley Athletic Conference (KVAC) is a high school athletic organization, featuring schools from the towns that surround the Kennebec River in the state of Maine. It is the largest athletic conference in the state with 29 different schools as members.

Member schools
The KVAC consists of 28 different schools, which are divided into two divisions in two different classes (Class A, & Class B) in coordination with the Maine Principals' Association (MPA). Membership includes:

Soccer/Baseball/Softball

Basketball

In conjunction with the MPA and its member schools, the KVAC administers the following sports: Football, Soccer, Field Hockey, Golf, Cross Country, Cheerleading, Basketball, Indoor Track, Skiing, Swimming, Wrestling, Ice Hockey, Baseball, Softball, Tennis, Outdoor Track, and Lacrosse. Members schools and athletes compete for team and individual conference championship status between the end of the regular season and the start of the MPA playoffs.

Membership drastically changed in the early-mid 2000s when schools switched regions and classes. In the late 1990s and early 2000s, Class A membership included Waterville, Lawrence, Skowhegan, Mt. Blue, Messalonskee, Cony, Medomak Valley, and Gardiner as Eastern Maine schools and Brunswick, Morse, Mt. Ararat, Oxford Hills, and Leavitt as Western Maine schools in sports like basketball.  The five Western Maine schools were moved into Eastern Maine for the 2001–02 season. This was due to two reasons. One, enrollment at EM schools in more northern parts of the state were dropping and schools like Stearns, Caribou, and later Presque Isle were moving down to Class B (all the way down to Class D in the case of Stearns). Another reason was the MPA's failed four division format where Eastern and Western Maine were split into north–south divisions. That format lasted one year. Edward Little and Lewiston, former members of the Southwestern Maine Activities Association, joined in 2003. That move was followed by the decision to move those schools to Eastern Maine. The KVAC also gained former Class A members of the Big East/Penobscot Valley Conference from the Bangor area in 2005 when that league was forced to disband due to loss of membership. 5 schools, Bangor High School, Brewer High School, Nokomis Regional High School, Old Town High School, and Hampden Academy, joined. Bangor, Brewer, and Hampden continue to be members of the Class A division, while Nokomis moved to Class B, and Old Town moved to Class B, but returned to the Big East/PVC. Erskine has jumped between Classes A and B since 2005 but will move back to B in 2013. Gardiner moved to Class B in 2007. Leavitt and Nokomis dropped to B in 2009, with Leavitt moving to the West. Morse dropped from EM Class A to WM Class B in 2011. Rockland District High School merged with nearby Georges Valley High School in 2011 to form Oceanside East/West High School. Oak Hill High School was a Class B member until 2012 when they moved to the Mountain Valley Conference, a Class B/C league in the western mountains. Erskine moved to Class B in 2013, and Maranacook to Class C. Spruce Mountain High School of Jay, a member of the Mountain Valley Conference, briefly joined the league in 2014 school year, but then returned to the MVC in 2017.

Starting with the 2015–16 season, basketball will be divided into five classes and into north and south regions.

The KVAC also holds an annual banquet in May to recognize 10 Senior Scholars from each of its member schools.

Cross-Country

Class A Champions

Women

Men

Class B Champions

Women

Men

Men (Wheelchair Race)

Indoor Track & Field

Class A Champions

Men

Women

Class B Champions

Men

Women

Meet Records

Women

Men

Outdoor Track & Field

Class A

Men

Women

Class B

Men

Women

Soccer

Class A

Men

 *No KVAC Game held in 2005. Winner determined by record.
 * Decided by Penalty Kicks

Women

 *No KVAC Game held in 2005. Winner determined by record.

Class B Champions

Men

Women

Golf
Men's Champions

Basketball

Men

Women

References

Sports in Maine
High school sports conferences and leagues in the United States